Blatchford, a surname, may refer to:

People
 Christie Blatchford (1951–2020), a Canadian newspaper columnist and broadcaster
 Claire Blatchford (born 1944), a deaf American author
 Edgar Blatchford (born 1950), an Alaska politician and newspaper publisher
 Edward Blatchford (born 1972), an American actor known for his role in the television series Malibu, CA
 Eliphalet Wickes Blatchford (1826–1915), an American manufacturer
 Howard Peter "Cowboy" Blatchford (1912–1943), a Canadian flying ace in World War II
 Ian Blatchford (born 1965), a British museum director
 Joseph Blatchford (born 1934), founder of Acción International and third director of the United States Peace Corps (1969–1971)
 Kenny Blatchford (1882–1933), a mayor of Edmonton, Alberta, and member of the Canadian House of Commons
 Liz Blatchford (born 1980), a British professional triathlete
 Neil Blatchford, an American speed skater
 Olivia Blatchford (born 1993), an American squash player
 Richard M. Blatchford (1859–1934), a U.S. Army general in World War I
 Richard M. Blatchford (attorney) (1798–1875), an American attorney, public official, and diplomat
 Robert Blatchford (1851–1943), a British socialist campaigner and author
 Samuel Blatchford (1820–1893), an Associate Justice of the Supreme Court of the United States
 Samuel Blatchford (university president), first president of Rensselaer Polytechnic Institute (1824–1828)
 Samuel Nathan Blatchford (1925–2005), an American soldier and civil engineer, most decorated Native American veteran of World War II
 Torrington Blatchford (1871–1938), an Australian geologist

Other uses
 Blatchford Field, former site of Edmonton City Centre Airport (1927–2013), named for Kenny Blatchford
 Blatchford, Edmonton, a planned community in Edmonton, Alberta, under development on the former Blatchford Field
 Glasgow-Blatchford score, a medical screening tool

See also
 Blachford (disambiguation)

Disambiguation pages with surname-holder lists